The Ministry of Justice of the Union of Soviet Socialist Republics (USSR) (Ministerstvo Yustitsii SSSR), formed on 15 March 1946, was one of the most important government offices in the Soviet Union. It was formerly (until 1946) known as the People's Commissariat for Justice (Narodniy Komissariat Yustitsi'i) abbreviated as Наркомюст (Narkomiust). The Ministry, at the All-Union (USSR-wide) level, was established on 6 July 1923, after the signing of the Treaty on the Creation of the USSR, and was in turn based upon the People's Commissariat for Justice of the Russian Soviet Federative Socialist Republic (RSFSR) formed in 1917. The Ministry was led by the Minister of Justice, prior to 1946 a Commissar, who was nominated by the Chairman of the Council of Ministers and confirmed by the Presidium of the Supreme Soviet, and was a member of the Council of Ministers.

The Ministry of Justice was responsible for courts, prisons, and probations. Further responsibilities included criminal justice policy, sentencing policy, and prevention of re-offending in the USSR. The Ministry was organised into All-Union and Union departments. The All-Union level ministries were divided into separate organisations in the Republican, Autonomous Oblast, and provincial level. The leadership of the Ministry of Justice came from notable Soviet law organisations from around the country.

Duties and responsibilities

According to a decree from 1972, the Ministry of Justice prepared proposals for the codification of law; it carried out methodological management of legal work in the national economy. The Ministry directed and coordinated the work of state bodies and public organisations to promote legal knowledge and to clarify the law among the population about the judicial agencies, as well as general management of the civil registry, state, and legal profession. The Ministry was liable to the Party, the state, and the people. The Ministry's main goal was to strengthen socialist legality and the rule of law within Soviet judicial institutions.

The Ministry was organised into one All-Union (USSR-wide) ministry and 15 Union ministries. The leadership of the ministry consisted of notable figures of the judicial authority of the Soviet Republics, the military tribunals, Bar members, notaries, and other judicial institutions. The leadership's task was to organise and prepare proposals for the codification of legislation. The organisational leadership, and the courts, had full control over the republican, autonomous, and provincial levels of government and the party. On 1 February 1923 the All-Union People's Commissariat for Justice was dissolved, and its responsibilities, duties, and functions were given to the Procurator General. The Department of the Procuracy of the Ministry of Justice, headed by a republican Procurator General, was responsible for limiting the powers of the Procurator General. On the grounds of stopping "unnecessary centralisation", the Ministry of Justice was dissolved both on the Union and the All-Union level. The functions of the Ministry was then handed to the Supreme Court and the Legal Commission of the Council of Ministers. The Ministry was reestablished in 1970 by the Alexei Kosygin government. Extensive regulations on the Ministry were created by the Council of Ministers. The Ministry's main task was to direct and supervise judicially organs, both at the Union and All-Union level, according to a decree from 1975.

The main task of the Ministry was to develop proposals on issues linked to the judicial system; the election of judges, elect the judiciary, organising the judiciary, studying and summarising of the jurisprudence in coordination with the Supreme Court, and to organise work for the maintenance of judicial statistics. According to Soviet law, the Ministry could propose various measures to improve the Soviet court system. According to Article 1 of the People's Commissariat for Justice, the commissariat's main task was to supervise the legal activities of the Soviet central agencies and the people's procurator.

Organisation
The Ministry of Justice was headed by a Minister who was elected by the Presidium of the Supreme Soviet between seasons, and authenticated by a Supreme Soviet convocation. Deputy Ministers were elected by the Council of Ministers; allocation of the deputies was decided by the Ministry of Justice. Each deputy usually headed his or her own department. The minister, the deputies, and other senior officials formed the leadership circle, known as the Board of the Ministry of Justice. The members of this board were approved by the Council of Ministers. The Board of the Ministry held meetings regularly to discuss legal matters nationwide. Decisions made by the board were as a rule implemented nationwide. If the board disagreed they sought the assistance of the Council of Ministers to solve the problem.

The structure and number of employees of the Ministry were approved by the Council of Ministers. Staffing of the central apparatus of the Ministry, as well as provisions of the departments and divisions, were approved by the Ministry of Justice. The seal of the Ministry of Justice was the state emblem of the USSR.

History

In 1922 Vladimir Lenin chasitised the People's Commissariat for Justice for not dealing firmly enough with political opponents of the Bolsheviks and allowing capitalism to develop outside the framework of state capitalism outlined by the New Economic Policy. Until 1936 the People's Commissariat for Justice existed only in the Union Republican level. Nikolai Krylenko, the first People's Commissar of Justice, said in January 1933 that Soviet law waxed indignant about the leniency of some Soviet officials who objected to the infamous "five ears law":

We are sometimes up against a flat refusal to apply this law rigidly. One People's Judge told me flatly that he could never bring himself to throw someone in jail for stealing four ears. What we're up against here is a deep prejudice, imbibed with their mother's milk... a mistaken belief that people should be tried in accordance not with the Party's political guidelines but with considerations of "higher justice."

According to Abdurakhman Avtorkhanov,  Nikita Khrushchev abolished the Ministry during the height of the Khrushchev Thaw in an attempt to restore the "Leninist norms of socialist legality" which had disappeared under Joseph Stalin's rule. Khrushchev tried to make the Soviet court more independent from central authority by enforcing the 1936 constitution on the country's judicial branch. This would, according to Khrushchev, give the courts further independence from the central authority. The functions, duties, and responsibilities of the Ministry were reassigned to the Supreme Soviet and the Legal Commission of the Council of Ministers at all levels of Soviet society. By the 1960s it became clear that these reforms were not working as planned, and the ministry was reestablished by the Alexei Kosygin government in 1970. The Ministry, along with the majority of other Soviet ministries, was supposed to be abolished in December 1991 on the orders of the State Soviet, this did not happen, and the Soviet Union dissolved itself before this date.

Commissars and ministers
The following persons headed the Commissariat/Ministry as commissars (narkoms), ministers, and deputy ministers of the Soviet era:

See also
Law
 Socialist law
 Law of the Soviet Union
 Constitution of the Soviet Union
Organisations
 Foreign Legal Collegium
 Procurator General of the USSR
 People's Court of the USSR
 Supreme Court of the USSR

References

External links
Governments of  the Union of Soviet Socialist Republics from 1917–1964 and 1964–1991

Justice
Politics of the Soviet Union
Soviet law
Soviet
Ministries established in 1923
1923 establishments in the Soviet Union
1936 establishments in the Soviet Union
1970 establishments in the Soviet Union
Government agencies disestablished in 1991